HGPS may refer to:
 Progeria (Hutchinson–Gilford progeria syndrome)
 Hellisheiði Power Station, in Iceland
 Holy Ghost Preparatory School, in Bensalem, Pennsylvania, United States
 Hospital General de la Plaza de la Salud in the Dominican Republic
 LMNA, or Lamin A/C, a protein
 ROBO3, or Roundabout homolog 3, a protein

See also 
 HGP (disambiguation)